Ejgo Vejby Nielsen (born 29 April 1940) is a Danish rower. He competed in the men's coxed four event at the 1960 Summer Olympics.

References

1940 births
Living people
Danish male rowers
Olympic rowers of Denmark
Rowers at the 1960 Summer Olympics
People from Lolland